William Edwardes, 3rd Baron Kensington (3 February 1801 – 1 January 1872), was a British peer and naval commander.

Kensington was the son of William Edwardes, 2nd Baron Kensington, and Dorothy Patricia Thomas. He succeeded his father as third Baron Kensington in 1852 but as this was an Irish peerage it did not entitle him to a seat in the House of Lords. Kensington served in the Royal Navy and achieved the rank of captain. He was also Lord Lieutenant of Pembrokeshire.

Lord Kensington married Laura Jane Ellison, daughter of Cuthbert Ellison, in 1833. He died in January 1872, aged 70, and was succeeded in the barony by his son William, who became a Liberal politician.

See also

Notes

References
Kidd, Charles, Williamson, David (editors). Debrett's Peerage and Baronetage (1990 edition). New York: St Martin's Press, 1990.

1801 births
1872 deaths
Barons in the Peerage of Ireland
Lord-Lieutenants of Pembrokeshire
Royal Navy officers